Irangaam Records is a record label based in Enqelab Street , Tehran .  It was founded in 1985 by an Iranian  Sadroddin Hosseinkhani  . The label focuses on Iranian music. Irangaam Records has been established by this slogan :  Music For Everyone .

See also
 List of record labels

References

Record labels established in 1985
Persian pop music
Persian music
Iranian record labels
1985 establishments in Iran